Five Sixteenth-Century Poems is a song cycle for voice and piano composed in 1938 by John Ireland (18791962).

A performance takes about 10 minutes. The poems are:

 "A Thanksgiving" (William Cornysh (14651523)) 
 "All in a Garden Green" (Thomas Howell)
 "An Aside" (Anon.)
 "A Report Song" (Nicholas Breton (15421626))
 "The Sweet Season" (Richard Edwardes (152566))

References 

Song cycles by John Ireland
Classical song cycles in English
1938 compositions